Down to Earth, also known as The Optimist, is a 1917 American comedy romance film starring Douglas Fairbanks and Eileen Percy, and directed by John Emerson. Most of the principal photography was filmed in Yosemite National Park.

Synopsis
Bill Gaynor (Fairbanks) follows Ethel (Percy), the girl he loves, to a sanitarium she is staying to recuperate from a nervous break down. Ethel had previously refused his proposal in favor of a socialite, Charles Riddles (Charles K. Gerrard). Bill hatches up a plan to save Ethel and the other hypochondriacs from the sanitarium, taking them on his yacht through the ruse of a smallpox scare. The yacht crashes onto an island, where Bill makes the invalids work for their own food and where they all overcome their illnesses. Two months later, Charles discovers that Palm Beach is actually in the valley below them, and he escapes the camp. Charles meets up with a friend to complain about his Ordeal and with his friend's encouragement, they return to the camp and try to "kidnap" Ethel. Bill (Who was not taking his usual siesta) catches them in the act, and tying one arm behind his back, kicks Charles' ass. Bill admits to Ethel that they are not on an actual desert island, but she tells him that she has known that for a month. As the two float away in a row boat, the other patients comment that they should return to their siestas because the story is over.

Cast
Douglas Fairbanks as Billy Gaynor
Eileen Percy as Ethel Forsythe
Gustav von Seyffertitz as Dr. Jollyem
 Charles McHugh as Dr. Samm
Charles K. Gerrard as Charles Riddles
William H. Keith as Mr. Carter
Ruth Allen as Mrs. Fuller Jermes
Fred Goodwins as Jordan Jinny
Florence Mayon as Mrs. Phattison Oiles
Herbert Standing as Mr. SD Dyspeptic
David Porter as Mr. Coffin
Bull Montana as  Wild Man

References

External links

 
allmovie/synopsis; Down to Earth

1917 films
1917 romantic comedy films
American romantic comedy films
Articles containing video clips
American black-and-white films
American silent feature films
Films directed by John Emerson
1910s American films
Silent romantic comedy films
Silent American comedy films
1910s English-language films